The lingual foramen is a small midline opening on the posterior aspect of the symphysis of the mandible, just above the mental spine. The lingual foramen gives passage to a single small artery formed by the union of two branches of the sublingual arteries (each sublingual artery contributing a single branch).

References

Bones of the head and neck